Patricia Ignacia Briones Fernández (born 18 August 1962) is an Ecuadorian politician. She was the first female mayor of Portoviejo.

Political career
Patricia Briones was born in Portoviejo, Ecuador on 18 August 1962.

Briones entered public conscious as a beauty queen in 1976. Two years later, she was crowned the National Queen of Coffee. With 31.71% of the vote, becoming the first woman to be the mayor of Portoviejo. In early July 2005, Briones led a general strike of the city government to demand aid from the central government for aid with city projects. The strike ended when government ministers Rafael Correa and Wellington Sandoval agreed to grant the City of Portoviejo 62 million dollars for its projects. The city was paralysed for five days, costing six billion dollars and preventing entrance into the city via 25 barricades, making it the longest strike in the history of Manabí Province.

Citations

Living people
1962 births
Women mayors of places in Ecuador
21st-century Ecuadorian women politicians
21st-century Ecuadorian politicians